Aleksander Veiler (16 March 1887 Aleksandri Parish, Harju County – 17 October 1950 Toronto, Canada) was an Estonian politician. He was a member of I Riigikogu.

In 1917 he was a member of Estonian Provincial Assembly.

References

1887 births
1950 deaths
Members of the Estonian National Assembly
Members of the Riigikogu, 1920–1923
Members of the Estonian Provincial Assembly
Members of the Estonian Constituent Assembly
Members of the Riigikogu, 1926–1929
Estonian World War II refugees
Estonian emigrants to Canada
People from Põlva Parish